Adina is a genus of 11 species of flowering plants in the family Rubiaceae. They are shrubs or small trees, native to East Asia and Southeast Asia.

Description
Adina is a genus of shrubs and small trees. The terminal vegetative buds are inconspicuous and loosely surrounded by the stipules. The stipules are bifid for at least 2/3 of their length. The corolla lobes are nearly valvate in bud, being subimbricate at the apex. The anthers are basifixed and introrse. The ovary has two locules, with up to four ovules per locule.

Taxonomy
Adina was named by Richard Salisbury in 1807 in his book, The Paradisus Londinensis. The genus name is derived from the Ancient Greek word , meaning "clustered, crowded". It refers to the tightly clustered heads of flowers. The biological type for Adina consists of the specimens that Salisbury called Adina globiflora. These are now included in the species Adina pilulifera. Molecular phylogenetic studies have shown that Adina is paraphyletic over Adinauclea, a monospecific genus from Sulawesi and the Moluccas.

Species
Species currently accepted as of November 2016 (review completed):

 Adina cordifolia (Roxb.) Brandis - from India to Yunnan to Peninsular Malaysia
 Adina dissimilis Craib -  Thailand and Peninsular Malaysia
 Adina eurhyncha (Miq.) Å.Krüger & Löfstrand -  Borneo; W. Malesia; Sumatra.
 Adina fagifolia (Teijsm. & Binn. ex Havil.) Valeton ex Merr  - Sulawesi and Maluku
 Adina malaccensis (Ridsdale) Å.Krüger & Löfstrand  - Malaya; Thailand 
 Adina metcalfii Merr. ex H.L.Li, J. Arnold   SE. China to Thailand
 Adina multifolia Havil., J. Linn.  -  	Philippines, New Guinea
 Adina pilulifera (Lam.) Franch. ex Drake - Japan, China, Vietnam
 Adina pubicostata Merr. - Hunan, Guangxi, Vietnam
 Adina rubella Hance - China, Korea
Adina trichotoma (Zoll. & Moritzi) Benth. & Hook.f. ex B.D.Jacks. - from Assam to southern China south to Java and New Guinea

References

External links
World Checklist of Rubiaceae
 Adina At: Plant Names At: IPNI
 Adina In: The Paradisus Londinensis At: Adina At:Index Nominum Genericorum At: References At: NMNH Department of Botany At: Research and Collections At: Smithsonian National Museum of Natural History
 Adina At: List of Genera At: Rubiaceae At: List of families At: Families and Genera in GRIN At: Queries At: GRIN taxonomy for plants

Rubiaceae genera
Naucleeae